Bonython Hall is the "great hall" of the University of Adelaide, located in the university grounds and facing North Terrace, Adelaide. The building is on the now-defunct Register of the National Estate and the South Australian Heritage Register. It is primarily used for University graduation ceremonies, examinations, expositions and public lectures and meetings likely to draw large audiences.

History
The hall was built in the period 1933-1936 as a result of a donation of over £50,000 from Sir John Langdon Bonython. It was opened on 8 September 1936 by Governor-General Lord Gowrie and the first public lecture was held a week later.

Folklore
There are many local legends about the building, with two being particularly resilient:

Bonython Hall is opposite Pulteney Street. Folklore has it that the Bonython donation was made on the condition that a hall be built opposite Pulteney Street, thus blocking any future path through the parklands and preventing the division of the campus by a major thoroughfare.

Folklore also maintains that the Bonython family were very conservative and did not want the building used as a dance hall. Hence, the hall was designed and built with a sloping floor rather than flat floor.

Renovation works
Beginning in 2005, the University has been conducting renovation works. The quality of these works has been rewarded with an Award of Merit at the 2007 UNESCO Asia-Pacific Heritage Awards for Culture Heritage Conservation.

Gallery

References

Buildings and structures in Adelaide
University of Adelaide
UNESCO Asia-Pacific Heritage Awards winners
South Australian Heritage Register
Adelaide Park Lands
South Australian places listed on the defunct Register of the National Estate